Baldassin is a surname. Notable people with the surname include:

Luca Baldassin (born 1994), Italian footballer
Mike Baldassin (born 1955), American football player